Karen Venhuizen (born 4 April 1984) is a Dutch former competitive figure skater. She is the 2003 Triglav Trophy champion, the 2007 International Challenge Cup champion, and a nine-time (2000–08) Dutch national champion. She qualified for the free skate at seven ISU Championships – two World and five European Championships. Her best placement, 14th, came at the 2008 Europeans.

Personal life 
Venhuizen was born 4 April 1984 in Zoetermeer, Netherlands. From 2001 to 2003, she suffered from anorexia nervosa. After the 2008 European Championships, she was diagnosed with Guillain–Barré syndrome.

Career 
Venhuizen started skating at the age of five. In the 1999–2000 season, she debuted on the ISU Junior Grand Prix (JGP) series and then won her first senior national title, earning assignments to her first ISU Championships. In February 2000, she reached the free skate and finished 21st overall at the European Championships in Vienna after placing tenth in her qualifying group, 23rd in the short, and 21st in the free. In March, she competed at the 2000 World Junior Championships in Oberstdorf; she advanced out of her qualifying group but was eliminated after the short program.

Venhuizen made her final junior-level appearances at the start of the 2000–01 season before repeating as the Dutch national senior champion. She qualified for the final segment at both the 2001 European Championships in Bratislava and at the 2001 World Championships in Vancouver.

Venhuizen won gold medals at the 2003 Triglav Trophy in Slovenia and at the 2007 International Challenge Cup in The Hague. Her best ISU Championship result, 14th, came at the 2008 Europeans in Zagreb, Croatia. It was also the highest placement by a Dutch figure skater since Dianne de Leeuw became the European champion in 1976.

Programs

Results
GP: Grand Prix; JGP: Junior Grand Prix

References

External links

Navigation

1984 births
Living people
Dutch female single skaters
People from Zoetermeer
People with Guillain–Barré syndrome
Sportspeople from South Holland